Dolyhir railway station was a station in Dolyhir, Powys, Wales. The station opened in 1875 and closed in 1951. The station building survives today, and is located in the centre of a quarry. Great Western Railway closure signage is still visible on the building, nearly 70 years after its closure.

References

Further reading

Disused railway stations in Powys
Railway stations in Great Britain opened in 1875
Railway stations in Great Britain closed in 1951
Former Great Western Railway stations